The following is about the qualification rules and allocation of spots for the figure skating events at the 2022 Winter Olympics.

Qualification system 
A total of 144 quota spots are available to athletes to compete at the games. A maximum of 18 athletes can be entered by a National Olympic Committee, with a maximum of 9 men or 9 women. There is also an "Additional Athletes Quota" which allows up to a maximum of 5 more total skaters, bringing the potential total to 149.  The host (China) is the priority for these additional places so that if they have met minimum standards they may have an entry in each event, other than the team event.  If unused, these five quotas can be used to qualify nations for the team event if they only need an entry in one more discipline.

Skater qualification 
There is no individual athlete qualification to the Olympics; the choice of which athlete(s) to send to the Games is at the discretion of each country's National Olympic Committee. Each country is allowed a maximum of three entries per discipline, resulting in a maximum of 18 athletes (nine men and nine women) possible per country.

According to ISU rules, countries must select their entries from among skaters who have achieved a minimum technical elements score (TES) at an ISU-recognized international competition on or before 24 January 2022.

On the issue of the disqualification of participating athletes at the Winter Olympics, the ISU has issued a statement regarding its policy regarding doping violations which may be alleged for the duration of the events of the Games stating that the, “...International Skating Union cannot disclose any information about a possible anti-doping rule violation. This is regulated by the ISU anti-doping rules and the IOC anti-doping rules for the Beijing 2022 Olympics.”

Country qualification 
The number of entries for the figure skating events at the Olympic Games is limited by a quota set by the International Olympic Committee. A total of 144 quota spots are available to athletes to compete at the games. There will be 30 skaters in the disciplines of men's and women's singles, 19 pair skating teams, and 23 ice dance teams. Additionally, ten nations qualify for the team event.

Countries will be able to qualify entries to the 2022 Winter Olympics in two ways. Most spots are allocated based on the results of the 2021 World Championships. At the event, countries were able to qualify up to three entries in each discipline according to the usual system in place; countries which earned multiple spots to the Olympics also earned multiple spots to the 2022 World Championships, although the World Championships were not subject to the requirement that for 2/3 entries, countries must additionally qualify 2/3 skaters into the free segment. Every discipline qualifies independently.

At the World Championships, the system was as follows:

 According to the ISU's Rule 378(2), any competitor who qualified for the free program received a maximum placement score of 16, and any competitor who failed to qualify for the free program received a maximum placement score of 18.

Qualification spots available per tournament 
The results of the 2021 World Championships determined 83 total spots: 24 entries in each singles discipline, 16 in pairs, and 19 in ice dance. The available spots were awarded going down the results list, with multiple spots being awarded first.

The remainder of the spots will be filled at the Nebelhorn Trophy in Oberstdorf, Germany in late September 2021. Countries that had already earned an entry to the Olympics were not allowed to qualify additional entries at this final qualifying competition. However, if a country earned two or three spots at the World Championships, but did not have two or three skaters, respectively, qualify for the free skate, then they were allowed to send a skater who did not reach the free segment at World Championships to Nebelhorn to qualify the remaining spot(s). Unlike at the World Championships, where countries could qualify more than one spot depending on the placement of their skater(s), at the Nebelhorn Trophy, countries could earn only one spot per discipline, regardless of ranking.

Initially, a total of six spots per singles event, three spots in pairs, and four in ice dance were available at Nebelhorn Trophy. One additional quota spot became available in men's singles following the 2021 World Championships. If a country declines to use one or more of its qualified spots, the vacated spot is awarded using the results of Nebelhorn Trophy in descending order of placement.

For the team trophy, scores from the 2021 World Figure Skating Championships and the 2021–22 Grand Prix season, will be tabulated to establish the ten top nations. Each nation compiles a score from their top performers in each of the four disciplines. The Grand Prix Final, to be held in early December 2021, was to be the final event to affect the Team Trophy score, before it was cancelled.

Qualification timeline

Qualified countries 

 "Additional" quotas refer to extra quotas given to countries with athletes qualified in three disciplines so they can participate in the team event. Athletes who qualify via the team event quota compete in the team event only and cannot enter the individual competitions. Germany can send one man, Italy one woman, and Ukraine one pairs team (two athletes).

Qualification summary

Men's singles

Women's singles

Pairs

Ice dance

Team event

Next eligible NOC per event 
If a country rejects a quota spot then additional quotas become available. A country can be eligible for one quota spot per event in the reallocation process. Countries in bold indicate the country later received a quota spot. The following list is compiled after the remaining spots were allocated at the 2021 CS Nebelhorn Trophy. There were no alternates for the team event because no additional NOCs beyond the qualified ten met the eligibility criteria for inclusion in the event.

References 

Qualification
Qualification for the 2022 Winter Olympics